A duet is a musical composition or piece for two performers.

Duets or The Duets may also refer to:

Films and television
 Duets (film), a 2000 film, starring Gwyneth Paltrow, Paul Giamatti and Huey Lewis
 "Duets" (Glee), a 2010 episode in the second season of Glee
 Duets (TV series), a music-based reality competition show on ABC

Music
 Duets (Bach), works for organ  by Johann Sebastian Bach

Albums 
 Duets (Ane Brun album), 2005
 Duets (Barbra Streisand album), 2002
 Duets (Carla Bley & Steve Swallow album), 1988
 Duets (Dizzy Gillespie album), 1957
 Duets (Elton John album), 1993
 Duets (Emmylou Harris album)
 Duets (Frank Sinatra album), 1993
 Duets II (Frank Sinatra album), a 1994 album by Frank Sinatra
 Duets (Helen Merrill and Ron Carter album), a 1989 album by Helen Merrill and Ron Carter
 Duets (Jimmy Raney and Doug Raney album), 1979
 Duets (Linda Ronstadt album), 2014
 Duets II (Tony Bennett album), 2011
 Duets (Joe Pass and John Pisano album), 1991
 Duets (Kenny Rogers album), 1984
 Duets (Roscoe Mitchell and Anthony Braxton album), 1976
Reba: Duets, a 2007 album by Reba McEntire
Duets: The Final Chapter, a 2005 album by The Notorious B.I.G.
Duets: An American Classic, a 2006 album by Tony Bennett
Duets, a 2017 album by The Wiggles
Duets 1976, Anthony Braxton and Muhal Richard Abrams
Duets: Hamburg 1991, Anthony Braxton and Peter Niklas Wilson
Duets (1993), Anthony Braxton and Mario Pavane
Duets: Re-working the Catalogue, a 2015 album by Van Morrison and others
The Duets (Jo Stafford and Frankie Laine album), 1994
The Duets (Mulgrew Miller album), 1999

See also 
 Duetos (disambiguation)
 Duet (disambiguation)